Commando (1898–1905) was an American Hall of Fame Champion Thoroughbred racehorse.

Racing career
Bred at Castleton Stud by owner James R. Keene, Commando raced at age two, winning five of his six starts and finishing second in the other as a result of jockey error. At age three, Commando raced only three times, winning the Belmont Stakes and the Carlton Stakes. In the Belmont Stakes at Morris Park Racecourse he faced two opponents, only one of whom, The Parader was seen as a serious rival. Commando made almost all the running before going clear in the straight and winning easily. Although he finished second, an injury in the Lawrence Realization Stakes ended his racing career.

Stud record
Retired to stand at stud at Castleton Farm, Commando proved to be a successful sire. Unfortunately he died on 13 March 1905 at age seven after developing tetanus from a cut sustained to his foot. He was buried at Castleton Farm. Although his breeding career was limited to four seasons, Commando produced 10 stakes winners from 27 foals and posthumously topped the U.S. sire list in 1907. Among his progeny were Hall of Fame champions Colin and Peter Pan.

Honors
In 1956, Commando was inducted posthumously into the National Museum of Racing and Hall of Fame. A painting of Commando by equine artist Charles L. Zellinsky is on display as part of the Museum's collection.

Pedigree

References

1898 racehorse births
1905 racehorse deaths
Racehorses bred in Kentucky
Racehorses trained in the United States
American Champion racehorses
American Thoroughbred Horse of the Year
Belmont Stakes winners
United States Thoroughbred Racing Hall of Fame inductees
United States Champion Thoroughbred Sires
Thoroughbred family 12-b